The culture of Chennai, popularly called the "Gateway to the South India", is distinct from that of any other Indian city. Being a cosmopolitan hub, the city's culture reflects its diverse population that has resulted in a unique blend. Though a modern metropolis, Chennai continues to be traditional and conventional in certain ways. Traditional music, dance and all other art forms of Tamil Nadu are very popular in the city. One can find a peculiar cultural blend in city, from traditional foods to fast foods, from ancient temple architecture to modern high-rises, and from classical music and dance to the growing nightlife.

Music, dance and drama 

The city is known for its classical music shows. Every December, Chennai holds a five-week-long Music Season, which has been described as one of the world's largest cultural events. The Music Season encompasses performances (kacheries) of traditional Carnatic music by hundreds of artists in and around the city. This happens during the Tamil season of Margazhi and this period is a festive and joyous time in chennai. The mercury lies in the low twenties and the music rendered by the great musicians is soul-stirring and sensational. Carnatic music makes the December season a must-experience for visitors to Chennai.

Chennai is also known for the classical Indian dance, the Bharatanatyam, which is also the official dance of Tamil Nadu. An important cultural centre for Bharatanatyam is Kalakshetra (Sanskrit for "place of the arts"), located on the beach in the south of the city.

Chennai has a vibrant theatre scene, with a large number of Tamil plays being performed. Political satire, slapstick comedy, history, mythology and drama are some of the popular genres of Tamil plays.  Prominent theatre personalities include Pammal Sambanda Mudaliar, K.S. Nagarajan, Cho Ramaswamy, Indira Parthasarathy, R.S. Manohar, N. Muthuswamy,  English theatre is also popular in Chennai.Evam, a popular English theatre company is based in Chennai. They are the logistics partners of The Metroplus Theatre festival which is held by a leading newspaper of the city, The Hindu, every year around July and August. A number of other English theatre companies like Unarviyam, Stray Factory, Theatre Y, ASAP productions, Still Water Productions, Boardwalkers, Masquerade - the performance group, Theatre Nisha, Rebelz, Stagefright Productions and last but not the least, India's oldest English theatre company,Madras Players stage plays throughout the year. Over the last four years, Chennai has become active in theatre activities. School and college cultural festivals (locally called culfests) play an important role by providing platforms for the city's youth to indulge in art and culture. These culfests attract participants from around India. Some of the larger culfests in the city are Instincts(SSN College of Engineering), Saarang (IITM), Techofes (College of Engineering, Guindy), Deep Woods (MCC), Kalakrithi (ACT), Mitafest (MIT) Down Sterling (Loyola) and Srishti (Ethiraj College for Women).

Madras youth choir, based at Chennai - the oldest Indian choral music group in India started by M B srinivasan, presents many programmes through the year.

Also present is an established and growing culture of bands in western and other styles. Predominantly these are 'student bands', although there are professional bands such as The LBG.  While the student bands are most visible in cultural fests and other competitions, pro-events like the June Rock Out, organised by the Unwind Centre, are dominated by established bands.

The mylapore webportal dedicated to Arts & Culture of Chennai, music, drama, awards and events.

Cinema

Chennai is the base for the large Tamil movie industry, known as the Kollywood. The industry is, especially, attributed to the locality of Kodambakkam, where most of the movie studios are located. The industry makes about 100 Tamil movies a year, and its film soundtracks dominate the music scene in the city. Kollywood is the second biggest revenue generating Movie Industry in India only after Bollywood. Tamil movies and personalities are followed worldwide. Some of most technologically advanced movie studios of India are located in Chennai. Chennai also conducts Movie Fairs every year, attracting movies from worldwide. The Chennai film industry produced the first nationally distributed film across India in 1948 with Chandralekha. They have one of the widest overseas distribution, with large audience turnout from the Tamil diaspora. They are distributed to various parts of Asia, Africa, Western Europe, North America and Oceania. It is estimated by the Manorama Yearbook 2000 (a popular almanac) that over 5,000 Tamil films were produced in the 20th century.

Art 

Chennai has played a vital role in the evolution of traditional and contemporary art in India.

Lalit Kala Akademi, at Greams Road, holds regular exhibitions of works by established and emerging artists.

The Cholamandal Artists' Village is a centre of art and craft where artists and sculptors work in their own studios to supplement their income from the sale of paintings or sculptures. A permanent gallery attracts visitors throughout the year.

Chennai has produced some of the finest artists in India like K.C.S. Panicker, K.M.Adimoolam, A.V. Ilango, R.B. Bhaskaran, R.M. Palaniappan and N. Radhakrishnan.

Emerging artists including Aparajith, Benita Perciyal, Sivabalan, Cheenu Pillai, Sheela Maradi and Ramasuresh have made a name for themselves.

People

The majority of residents in Chennai are native Tamilians and descendants of settlers from different part of Tamil Nadu. There are also sizeable migrant Telugu, Malayalee, Sri Lankan Tamil communities in the city. A regional hub since British times, other prominent communities are the Anglo Indian, Bengali, Punjabi, Gujarati and Marwari communities and people from Uttar Pradesh and Bihar. Chennai also has a growing expatriate population especially from the United States, Europe and East Asia who work in the industries and IT centres.

Tamil is the city's first language. English is spoken widely in South Chennai and Central Chennai, (Kanchipuram and Chennai districts) and is used almost exclusively in business, education and other white collar professions. Tamil spoken in Chennai uses English words liberally, so much so that it is often called Madras bhashai  (Tamil for "Madras language"). Other languages spoken in the city include Telugu, Malayalam and Urdu and they contribute to the vocabulary of Madras bhashai as well.

Chennai celebrates a number of festivals. Pongal, celebrated in the month of January, is the most important festival of and is celebrated over a period of five days. Pongal has been designated the "State Festival" for its unique celebration that is typical of Tamil Nadu. Though a harvest festival it is still celebrated widely in the city. Tamil New Year's Day signifying the beginning of the Tamil calendar usually falls on 14 April and is celebrated widely. Being a cosmopolitan city, almost all major religious festivals like Deepavali, Eid and Christmas are celebrated here.

Cuisine

See also

References